Creature often refers to:

 An animal, monster, or alien

Creature or creatures may also refer to:

Film and television
 Creature (1985 film), a 1985 science fiction film by William Malone
 Creature (miniseries), a 1998 TV movie about an amphibious shark-like monster
 Creature (1999 film), a 1999 documentary by Parris Patton
 Alien Lockdown, a 2004 television film that was shown under the title Creature via Sci-Fi Channel in UK
 Creature (2011 film), a 2011 horror film
 Creature 3D, a 2014 Hindi film directed by Vikram Bhatt
 The Creature (film), a 1924 German silent film

Literature
 Creature, a 1989 novel by John Saul
 Creature, a 1997 novel by Peter Benchley, a reissue of the 1994 novel White Shark
 Creature!, a 2010 manga series by Shingo Honda

Music
 Creature (band), a Canadian band
 Creature (musician) (born 1973), New York rapper
 Creature (Moist album), 1996
 Creature (Within the Ruins album), 2009
 Creatures (Motionless in White album), 2010
 Creatures (Elf Power album), 2002
 The Creatures, a British duo formed in 1981
 The Creatures (Australian band), 1960s
 The Creatures, late 1980s group, pre-The Original Sins
 "Creature" (song), a 2017 song by KSI from the extended play Space
 "Creatures (For a While)", a song by the band 311
 "Creature", a song by Asking Alexandria from the album From Death to Destiny
 "Creature", a song by Atreyu from the album A Death-Grip On Yesterday
 "Creature", a song by Luminous from the album Luminous in Wonderland
 "Creature", a song by Pop Smoke featuring Swae Lee from the album Shoot for the Stars, Aim for the Moon

Organizations
 Creature (company), an American advertising agency
 Creatures Inc., a Japanese video game developer

Video games
 Creatures (video game series), a series of artificial life simulation video games
 Creatures (1996 video game), the first title in the series
 Creatures (1990 video game), a 1990 Commodore 64 game

Other uses
 Legendary creature, a mythological or folkloric creature
 Creature of statute, a legal entity, such as a corporation, created by statute
 Creature, a character from the reality show Who Wants to Be a Superhero?
 Gill-man or The Creature, the title character from the 1954 science-fiction horror film Creature from the Black Lagoon

See also
 
 
 Kreacher
 Life
 Life form